"Bawitdaba" is a song by American singer Kid Rock. Released in 1999 from his fourth studio album, Devil Without a Cause (1998), "Bawitdaba" helped push the success of the album. It became one of his most popular songs, receiving critical praise and entering the top 10 on the New Zealand Singles Chart.

Background
"Bawitdaba" has been described as having a nu metal sound. Its chorus has been described as a "neo-gregorian drone"; this chorus was derived from hip hop chants, such as the refrain from the Sugar Hill Gang's "Rapper's Delight". The guitar riff at the bridge is lifted from "Cowboys from Hell" by groove metal pioneers Pantera. The lyrics of the song are dedicated to "chicks with beepers", the IRS, as well as "all the crackheads, the critics, the cynics / And all my heroes in the methadone clinic."

In the demo recording of the song, Kid Rock shouts, "Now get in the pit and try to kill someone!" On the album version, Kid Rock changed the lyrics, replacing the word "kill" with "love". Regarding the change, Kid Rock told The Baltimore Sun that he was glad he changed the lyrics, explaining that mosh pits are about coexistence.

Reception
"Bawitdaba" is considered to be one of Kid Rock's best songs. In 2009, "Bawitdaba" was named the 47th best hard rock song of all time by VH1.

Usage in Media 
It was frequently used in the 2000s by the Detroit Pistons which then transitioned into The Final Countdown for player introductions

Track listings

UK CD1
 "Bawitdaba" (radio edit) – 3:32
 "My Oedipus Complex" (Father edit) – 3:51
 "My Oedipus Complex" (Son edit) – 4:28
 "Bawitdaba" (enhanced video)

UK CD2
 "Bawitdaba" (radio edit) – 3:32
 "Cowboy" (album version) – 4:16
 "Prodigal Son" (album version) – 5:41
 "Cowboy" (video)

UK CD3
 "Bawitdaba" (radio edit) – 3:32
 "I Am the Bullgod" (album version) – 4:50
 "Paid" (album version) – 4:45
 "I Am the Bullgod" (video)

European and Australian CD single
 "Bawitdaba" (edit) – 3:32
 "Bawitdaba" (album version) – 4:25
 "I Am the Bullgod" (live, electro-acoustic version) – 5:28

Credits and personnel
Credits are lifted from the UK CD1 and Devil Without a Cause liner notes.

Studios
 Recorded at White Room Studios and Temple of the Dog (Detroit, Michigan)
 Mixed at Abbey Road Studios (London, England)
 Mastered at Masterdisk (New York City)

Musicians
 Kid Rock – writing (as R. J. Ritchie), vocals, production, mixing, engineering
 Twisted Brown Trucker – additional engineering
 Uncle Kracker – writing (as Matthew Shafer), turntables
 Jason Krause – writing, metal guitar
 Kenny Olson – lead guitar
 Jimmie Bones – keyboards
 Stefanie Eulinberg – drums

Other personnel
 John Travis – additional production, engineering
 David Bottrill – mixing
 Al Sutton – engineering
 Derek Matuja – additional engineering
 Tony Dawsey – mastering
 Andy VanDette – mastering

Charts

Release history

References

1998 songs
1999 singles
Atlantic Records singles
Kid Rock songs
Lava Records singles
Music videos directed by Dave Meyers (director)
Nu metal songs
Rap metal songs
Songs written by Kid Rock
Songs written by Uncle Kracker